Saint-Georges-de-Chesné is a former commune in the Ille-et-Vilaine department in Brittany in northwestern France. On 1 January 2019, it was merged into the new commune Rives-du-Couesnon.

Geography

The adjacent communes are Vendel, Billé, Combourtillé, Mecé, Livré-sur-Changeon, Saint-Aubin-du-Cormier, and Saint-Jean-sur-Couesnon.

Population

See also
Communes of the Ille-et-Vilaine department

References

External links

 Geography of Brittany
 The page of the commune on infobretagne.com
 

Former communes of Ille-et-Vilaine